The Hyundai Dynasty is a premium executive sedan that debuted in 1996. Manufactured by Hyundai Motor Company, features of the Dynasty included electronically controlled suspension, dual climate control, and power memory seats (front and rear). To differentiate the Dynasty from its shared platform smaller Grandeur, Hyundai used a different badge (stylized D logo) for Dynasty. 

The Dynasty was produced in Ulsan, South Korea and it was discontinued in 2005. The Dynasty was the top level flagship at its introduction, but it was a front wheel drive vehicle. It featured higher level of luxury equipment and was available in extended length versions to differentiate it from the Grandeur models. The 2.5-litre V6 engine produces  at 6000 rpm, while the larger 3 and 3.5-liter engines offered  at 6000 and 5500 rpm respectively.

When the joint luxury flagship Mitsubishi Proudia/Hyundai Equus was introduced in April 1999, the flagship designation was removed from the Dynasty and sales suffered. The 3.5-litre engine was discontinued at this time.

With the introduction of a separate marketing channel for the rear-drive Genesis Motors, the market segment position formally filled by the front-wheel drive Dynasty was replaced by the Hyundai Aslan.

References

External links

2000s cars
Cars introduced in 1996
Executive cars
Front-wheel-drive vehicles
Flagship vehicles
Dynasty